The Governor of Santiago del Estero is a citizen of the Santiago del Estero Province, in Argentina, holding the office of governor for the corresponding period. The governor is elected alongside a vice-governor. Currently the governor of Santiago del Estero is Gerardo Zamora.

Governors since 1983

See also
Chamber of Deputies of Santiago del Estero

References

Santiago del Estero
Santiago del Estero Province